Sex and Drugs and Sausage Rolls is a 1999 novel by the British author Robert Rankin. It is set in Brentford and features John Omally and Jim Pooley.

Plot introduction 
John Omally's ambition to be a rock star leads him to manage an odd rock group called Gandhi's Hairdryer.

Characters in "Sex and Drugs and Sausage Rolls"

John Omally
Jim Pooley
Soap Distant
Neville, the part-time barman
Norman Hartnell
Zorro the PaperBoy
Small Dave
Dr Vincent Trillby
A lady in a straw hat
and many more

Literary significance & criticism

Cover art

Other media

References

External links 
 Sproutlore, the "now official" Robert Rankin fan club.

1999 British novels
Novels by Robert Rankin
Doubleday (publisher) books
Brentford, London